Marble Canyon Provincial Park is a provincial park in British Columbia, Canada, established in 1956 to protect Marble Canyon, a limestone formation at the south end of the Marble Range. In 2001 the park was expanded to 355 hectares to include all of Pavilion Lake due to the presence of microbialites, a type of stromatolite important to research into astrobiology and other fields, and in 2010, it was further expanded to 2,544 hectares.

The park is also important in the culture of the Tskway'laxw people in whose territory it is located, and concealed in the side canyons of the gorge there are important pictograph sites. Within the park and along Pavilion Lake at its farther end from the main part of the canyon is Chimney Rock, the Secwepemc'tsn name for which, K'lpalekw, means "Coyote's Penis", and is an important spiritual site. A waterfall into Crown Lake, at the park's campground, is famous among ice-climbers as "Icy BC" and the walls of Marble Canyon are a major draw for rock climbers.  All three of the park's lakes are popular with recreational fishermen.

Facilities

The park's campground is located adjacent to British Columbia Highway 99 as it passes through the canyon.  There are thirty campsites open from April to September.

References

External links
BC Parks information site
BC govt Management Development Strategy for Marble Canyon Provincial Park
BC govt management development statement for Pavilion Lake

Provincial parks of British Columbia
Lillooet Country
Bonaparte Country
1956 establishments in British Columbia
Protected areas established in 1956